Wrestling was one of the many sports which was held at the 1997 West Asian Games in Tehran, Iran between 22 and 23 November 1997. The competition took place at Shohada 7th Tir Stadium.

Medalists

Freestyle

Greco-Roman

Medal table

References

UWW Database

External links
Official website

West Asian Games
1997 West Asian Games
1997 West Asian Games